There are 1,000 electric buses operating in Moscow. This is the largest electric bus fleet in Europe ahead of London's fleet. As of December 2021, electric buses serve 65 routes and since the beginning of their work, they have carried over 150 million passengers including 77 million passengers in 2021.

History 
The first electric buses entered the streets of Moscow in the end of 2018. Under the terms of the contracts, in 2018–2019, domestic manufacturers GAZ and KAMAZ supplied 300 electric buses to Moscow. Another 700 electric buses were delivered to Moscow in 2020 and 2021. Thus, Moscow’s electric bus fleet reached 1,000, the largest in Europe, in just 3 years. A further 450 to 500 buses are expected to be delivered in 2022.

Most of the batteries and propulsion equipment for the Moscow electric buses are made by Drive Electro, which has manufactured and supplied components for 600 of the city’s electric vehicles. Moscow plans to completely replace all its diesel and CNG buses with electric buses by 2030, and no more diesel buses will be ordered from 2021 onwards.

In 2022, it was announced that KAMAZ hydrogen fuel cell buses would be piloted in the city.

Gallery

See also 
 Low emission buses in London

References

External links 
 Electric bus. Everything you need to know about eco-friendly urban transport in Moscow 
Bus transport in Russia
Electric buses
Transport in Moscow